Timatic (Travel Information Manual Automatic) is a database containing documentation requirements for passengers traveling internationally via air, e.g. passport and visa requirements. Timatic, an abbreviation for Travel Information Manual Automatic, is used by airlines and their representatives (check-in agents, managers, etc.), airport staff, and travel agents to determine whether a passenger can be carried, as well as by airlines and travel agents to provide this information to travellers at the time of booking. This is critical for airlines due to the fines levied by immigration authorities every time a passenger is carried who does not have the correct travel documentation, as well as the airline's costs to return the incorrectly-boarded passenger to the original airport from which the passenger departed. 
 
The information contained in Timatic includes:
Passport requirements and recommendations
Visa requirements and recommendations
Health requirements and recommendations
Airport tax to be paid by the traveller at either departure or arrival airport
Customs regulations relating to import/export of goods and small pets by a passenger
Currency regulations relating to import and export by a passenger
 
Timatic was first established in 1963 and is managed by the Montreal-based International Air Transport Association (IATA). Over 500 million travellers have their documentation requirements checked against the Timatic database every year.

It is available in a number of forms, including:
Timatic – available via the SITA network
TIM – hard-copy book
TimaticWeb – web-based
Timatic XML
IATA Travel Centre, Consumer web portal

IATA has announced the Travel Pass application as an extension of Timatic that can manage COVID-19 test results, proof of vaccination and national entry rules.

References

External links
Online Timatic Database
IATA Travel Centre, Timatic Consumer Portal
article on TIM/Timatic (archived at Wayback Machine) 

International Air Transport Association
International travel documents
Travel technology